Matías Sebastián Kulfas (born 8 April 1972) is an Argentine economist and professor. He served as Minister of Productive Development from 10 December 2019 to 4 June 2022, in the cabinet of President Alberto Fernández, and previously served as Undersecretary of Small and Medium-sized Businesses from 2006 to 2008, as well as a member of the board of directors of the National Bank of Argentina (2008–2012) and as General Manager of the Argentine Central Bank (2012–2013).

Early life and education
Kulfas was born in 1972 in Buenos Aires. He studied high school at the Escuela Superior de Comercio Carlos Pellegrini, and then studied economy at the University of Buenos Aires, finishing his licenciatura in 1995. He then went on to finish a master's degree on Political Economy at the Latin American Faculty of Social Sciences, and later became a Doctor in Social Sciences in the same university. Since 2005 he has been a permanent faculty at the University of Buenos Aires School of Economics, where he teaches Argentine economic structure. He also teaches economic development at the National University of General San Martín.

Political career
Starting in 1994 Kulfas began working in the Ministry of the Treasury as a consultant at the Secretariat of Economic Planning (until 1995) and then at the National Directorate of International Accounting, from 1995 to 1996. Between 2000 and 2003, he was at the forefront of the Centro de Estudios para el Desarrollo Económico Metropolitano (CEDEM), an agency dependent on the Secretariat of Economic Development of the Buenos Aires city government, and he worked as an economic consultant in the same secretariat as well. In 2004, he began working in the Bank of Buenos Aires City, where he held the position of Economic Studies manager.

In 2006, Kulfas was appointed Undersecretary of Small and Medium-sized Businesses and Regional Development, then a centralized agency dependent on the Ministry of Economy. He worked under the successive administrations of Economy Ministers Felisa Miceli, Miguel Gustavo Peirano and Martín Lousteau.

Banco Nación and Central Bank
In 2008, he joined the board of directors of the Bank of the Argentine Nation (Banco Nación), then going on to be appointed General Manager of the Central Bank of Argentina in 2013; he remained in the post until 2013. Under his management, the Central Bank created a dependency specifically oriented toward financial services user complaints.

In 2017, Kulfas joined Alberto Fernández, Santiago Cafiero, Cecilia Todesca and others in forming Grupo Callao, a non-Kirchnerist Peronist think tank.

Ministry of Productive Development
On 10 December 2019, following speculation that he might be appointed Minister of Economy, Kulfas was appointed Minister of Productive Development by newly elected President Alberto Fernández as part of the new cabinet of Argentina, succeeding Dante Sica.

At the onset of the economic crisis caused by the COVID-19 pandemic and the subsequent lockdown measures, the Production and Labour ministries launched two complimentary social assistance schemes: the Ingreso Familiar de Emergencia ("Emergency Family Income", IFE) and the Asistencia de Emergencia al Trabajo y la Producción ("Emergency Labour and Production Assistance", ATP). The IFE programme granted 10,000 monthly pesos to informal sector workers and self-employed workers whose income was affected by the lockdown. In total, over 8 million people across the country during two months, and later continued to be issued for people living in urban centres where lockdown measures continued in place throughout 2020. On the other hand, the ATP programme granted half of the salaries of workers (active or otherwise) for a number of businesses. Lastly, the government forbid all terminations and unilateral suspensions of labour contracts for 120 days, later extending the measure to cover all of 2020 and 2021.

In June 2022, Fernández asked for Kulfas' resignation after allegations that the minister had made off-the-record remarks about Vice President Cristina Fernández de Kirchner.

References

External links

Official website of the Ministry of Productive Development (in Spanish)

1972 births
Living people
Argentine economists
Government ministers of Argentina
Politicians from Buenos Aires
University of Buenos Aires alumni
Academic staff of the University of Buenos Aires